Marwayne is a village in central Alberta, Canada.

Marwayne lies at the intersection between Highway 45 and Highway 897. The economy is based on agriculture and ranching, with the oil and gas sector playing an important part as well.

The village's name is unusual in combining parts of a personal name and a place name. In commemorates the pioneer Marfleet family, who emigrated from Wainfleet, Lincolnshire, England.  The first school in Marwayne opened in 1928.

Demographics 

In the 2016 Census of Population conducted by Statistics Canada, the Village of Marwayne recorded a population of 564 living in 231 of its 245 total private dwellings, a  change from its 2011 population of 612.

Notable People

See also 
List of communities in Alberta
List of villages in Alberta

References

External links 

1952 establishments in Alberta
Villages in Alberta